Pactyes was the Lydian put in charge of civil administration and gathering Croesus's gold when Lydia was conquered by Cyrus the Great of Persia around 546 BC:

He led a revolt against Cyrus and Tabalus, the Persian military commander or satrap whom Cyrus had put in charge of Lydia:

When Pactyes discovered that Cyrus intended to send an army against him, he fled to Cyme, who passed him on to Mytilene, from which he fled to Chios, and was finally captured by the Persians.

See also
History of Anatolia
Lydia (satrapy)

References

Lydia